The North Dakota State Bison soccer team is the NCAA Division I women's soccer team that represents North Dakota State University in Fargo, North Dakota. The program began its first season in 1995 under head coach Gordon Henderson. The Bison are currently coached by Mike Regan in his fifth year coaching the team.

History

Division II Days (1995-2004)
North Dakota State competed in Division II from their first season in 1995, until the school's transition to Division I began in 2004. During that time, the Bison competed in the North Central Conference and finished in the top four each year except for 2002. NDSU won the conference in 1999 and made the NCAA Tournament in Division II, that was the only time they would make the national tournament before entering Division I. The Bison held a 93-59-8 overall record while in Division II and a 25-21-3 conference record.

Division I Days (2004-Present)
In 2004, the school started their transition to Division I, and the team played as Division I independents for 2004 and 2005. In that time span, the Bison went 16-16-2. Then in 2006, NDSU played in the United Soccer Conference for one year. They finished with a 13-7-1 overall record, a 3-0-0 conference record that landed them as the first place team in the West division. However, the team was still ineligible for NCAA Tournament play due to their ongoing transition to Division I. Then in the Summer of 2007, NDSU joined the Summit League in all sports except football and wrestling. While the Bison did not finish well in their first two years in the conference, they managed to finish the regular season tied for first place in the 2009 season but lost in the Summit League tournament. Then in the next season (2010), the team finished the regular season tied for second place and beat Western Illinois to reach their first Division I NCAA Tournament. In the first round, the Bison would fall to Texas A&M.

Since that tournament berth, the Bison have finished in the top four of the Summit League eight times consecutively from 2011-18. NDSU finished the regular season in first place twice since 2011, in 2015 and 2016, but have not managed to win the conference tournament and return to the NCAA tournament. 
Source:

Season-by-season history

^ - Played in Spring 2021
^^ - Starting with the 2022 season, the Summit League expanded the women's soccer tournament to the top six teams instead of four.

Postseason history

NCAA Division I Tournament results
The Bison have appeared in one NCAA Division I Tournament. Their combined record is 0-1.

NCAA Division II Tournament results
The Bison appeared in one NCAA Division II Tournament. Their combined record was 0-1.

References

North Dakota State Bison
Women's soccer in the United States